The Trout River is a tributary of the Missisquoi River, flowing successively in municipalities of Montgomery, in Enosburg and in East Berkshire, in Franklin County, in northern Vermont in the United States.

The Trout River Valley is served by North Main Street (VT 118) passing on the northeast bank of the river. While the upper part is served by Jay Mountain Road (route 242) (north side of the river) and by Hazens Notch Road (route 58) on the south side.

The surface of the Trout River is generally frozen from mid-December to mid-March, with the exception of the rapids; however, safe circulation on the ice generally takes place from late December to early March.

Course
This source is located at the North of the route 58 and south of route 242 (Mountain Road).

  towards west, by collecting the Hannah Clark brook (coming from North-East), crossing the route 242 (Mountain Road) in the middle of Montgomery Center, up to the mouth of South Branch Trout River (coming from South);
  towards the northwest, following more or less the route route 118 (North Main Street), passing south of the village of Montgomery, crossing the North Main Street, up to Black Falls Brook (coming from the north-east);
  towards the northwest, doing a loop to the southwest and crossing the North Main Street, then branching north, crossing the Longley Bridge Road, going shortly along the Main North Street (on south side), branching west in order to collect a brook (coming from southwest), then curving to northwest, entering Enosburg and doing some serpentines, up to Alder Brook (coming from East);
  at first towards the north going along with North Main Street (on the west side), doing a loop to the North after crossing the Hopkins Bridge Road, branching to the ouest, then to the northwest entering in East Berkshire, up to the route 118;
  towards the northwest, doing two serpentines, up to the mouth.

The mouth of the Trout River is emptying on the south shore of Missisquoi River, right downstream of a river elbow. From there, the current goes generally westward on  up to eastern shore of Lake Champlain.

Toponymy 
The toponym "Trout River" was registered on October 29, 1980 in the USGS (US Geological Survey).

See also
Franklin County, Vermont
South Branch Trout River
Missisquoi River
Lake Champlain
Richelieu River
List of rivers of Vermont

References

Rivers of Vermont
Rivers of Franklin County, Vermont
Northern Forest Canoe Trail
Wild and Scenic Rivers of the United States